The Forokarta (φοροκάρτα) is a "tax card" proposed by the government of Greece in August 2011, which would be used to facilitate collection of receipts for purchases; this would allow the Greek finance ministry to clamp down on rampant tax evasion by comparing individuals' spending to their income and by comparing business' actual revenues to their accounts.

The card physically resembles a credit card. It does not display a name; it has a unique 10-digit ID number. The card was officially introduced on 3 October 2011.

The introduction of the card went hand in hand with other changes to the tax system. Because the card is used to track payments made by the holder but does not carry personally identifying information and does not entitle the holder to anything, theft of cards is not a great concern.

See also 
 Tax evasion and corruption in Greece

References

Taxation in Greece
Tax evasion
Corruption in Greece